Göktürks are a branch of Turks who formed an empire between 551 and 744.

Göktürk may also refer to:

Places
Göktürk, Istanbul a neighborhood within Eyüp district of Istanbul, Turkey
Göktürk, Gülnar a village in Gülnar district of Mersin Province, Turkey

Satellites
Göktürk-1
Göktürk-2
Göktürk-3

Other
First and Second Turkic Khaganate (or Göktürk Khaganate) the empire which was founded by the Göktürks